A horse, in geology, is any block of rock completely separated from the surrounding rock either by mineral veins or fault planes. In mining, a horse is a block of country rock entirely encased within a mineral lode. In structural geology the term was first used to describe the thrust-bounded imbricates found within a thrust duplex. In later literature it has become a general term for any block entirely bounded by faults, whether the overall deformation type is contractional, extensional or strike-slip in nature.

References

External links
 

Tectonics
Rock formations
Structural geology